USS Spangler (DE-696) was a  of the United States Navy.

Namesake
Donald Hays Spangler was born on 29 May 1918 in Albion, Indiana. He was appointed midshipman at the United States Naval Academy on 8 July 1938 and commissioned Ensign on 19 December 1941. He was promoted to the rank of lieutenant (junior grade) to date from 1 October 1942. He was killed in action when Atlanta was heavily damaged during the Naval Battle of Guadalcanal in the Solomon Islands on 13 November 1942.

Construction and commissioning
Spangler was laid down on 28 April 1943 at the Defoe Shipbuilding Company, Bay City, Michigan.  She was launched on 15 July 1943; sponsored by Mrs. Myrtle Spangler; and commissioned on 31 October 1943, with Lieutenant Commander W. A. Burgett in command.

Service history

World War II, 1943–1945
After shakedown in the vicinity of Bermuda, Spangler joined a convoy on 24 December 1943, and headed for the Pacific via the Panama Canal.  She arrived at Bora Bora in the Society Islands, on 20 January 1944. There she received orders to rendezvous with convoy Task Unit 116.15.3 as the flagship of Commander Escort Division 39, and to head for Espiritu Santo New Hebrides Islands.  In mid-February, she escorted  to Purvis Bay, Florida Island, in the Solomons, and then took up patrol station off Guadalcanal two days later.  After escorting  to Torokina Point on Bougainville, she rounded out the month patrolling off Blanche Harbor, Treasury Island, and off Purvis Bay.  For the next three months, Spangler escorted convoys on shuttle runs between various islands in the South Pacific.  During that period, she visited Guadalcanal, Espiritu Santo, New Caledonia, Florida Island, Majuro, Emirau, Rendova, and Manus.

She rendezvoused with the three ships at Manus on 27 May, delivered her cargo, and the four ships sortied the next day to join a hunter/killer group formed around the escort carrier . While England and Spangler headed toward the southern end of the scouting line, Raby and George charged to the attack. Both ships attacked the enemy, but with no apparent success. During the night, they lost contact with the submerged enemy. However, after a few hours, the Japanese commanding officer obligingly surfaced between Raby and George, and switched on his searchlights. England and Spangler raced toward the shaft of light which fixed Ro-105s position for them perfectly. By 05:00 on 31 May, they were in contact with Raby and George, and with the Officer in Tactical Command (OTC). At first light, Raby and George each attacked the Japanese submarine in quick succession. When their efforts failed, Spangler joined the fray. She attacked with 24 depth charges, but without success. Englands full pattern of depth charges at 07:35 brought a huge explosion and a watery grave to Ro-105.

On 2 June, the ships joined Task Group 30.4 (TG 30.4) and returned to Seeadler Harbor at Manus.  Spangler continued to operate with Hoggatt Bay until 21 June, when she headed for Purvis Bay and overhaul.  From the completion of overhaul in late July until the end of September, the destroyer escort operated out of Purvis Bay on escort assignments and anti-submarine warfare training.  During that period, she called at Guadalcanal, Espiritu Santo, Barika Island, Tulagi, Eniwetok, Tarawa, and Hollandia. In October, Spangler became station ship at Funafuti in the Ellice Islands.  However, she was employed in this role only briefly, and soon returned to Purvis Bay and escort duty, and, for the remainder of 1944, screened ships shuttling to Kossol Passage, Ulithi, and Guam.

Spanglers base of operations was changed to Guam on New Year's Day 1945. She was assigned to escort duty on the Guam-Ulithi supply route and the additional duty of hunter-killer operations.  Over the next three months, she escorted and patrolled as a part of the Marianas-Iwo Jima air-sea rescue unit.  From 26 April to 27 May, she served as station ship at Saipan; then she returned to her screening station off Guam until the end of World War II.  On 4 September, after returning to Guam from Okinawa, Spangler got underway, in company with Raby, and headed back to the United States.  The two destroyer escorts stopped at Pearl Harbor on 22 September; then continued on to San Pedro, Los Angeles, for overhaul.

Post-war activities, 1946–1958
After overhaul, Spangler departed the west coast on 20 February 1946 to return to the Western Pacific, via Pearl Harbor and Guam. She remained in the Far East for the next five months and, during the deployment, visited the Chinese ports of Swatow, Hong Kong, Shanghai, and Tsingtao.

Spangler entered San Diego on 2 March 1947 and, for the next eight and one-half years, operated out of that port along the California coast.  During those years, she often visited Long Beach and San Francisco, and made five voyages to Hawaii and one to Acapulco, Mexico.  On 4 October 1955, the destroyer escort departed San Diego for the western Pacific.  She stopped briefly at Pearl Harbor and at Midway Atoll, and made Yokosuka, Japan, on 22 October.  Spangler was deployed for six months, during which time she visited Sasebo, Japan; Hong Kong; and Subic Bay in the Philippines.  She left Yokosuka on 13 March 1956 and after stops at Midway and Pearl Harbor, reached San Diego on 31 March.  With the exception of one short trip to Long Beach and back in mid-September, Spangler spent the remainder of 1956 in port at San Diego.

On 3 January 1957, the destroyer escort again headed westward from San Diego.  This voyage took Spangler on a tour to many of the places made famous over a decade before; among her ports of call were Kwajalein Atoll and Auckland, New Zealand, in January; Manus in the Admiralty Islands in February, Guam in February and March; and Corregidor, Manila, and Singapore in April.  She also visited Yokosuka, Japan; Sattahip, Thailand; Hong Kong; Kaohsiung, Taiwan; Sasebo, Japan; Chinhae, Korea; and Kobe and Beppu, Japan.  On 20 June 1957, Spangler headed homeward from Yokosuka.  She returned to San Diego on 7 July, and, for the next 15 months, operated along the west coast.

Decommissioning and sale
On 8 October 1958, Spangler was decommissioned at Astoria, Oregon, and joined the Columbia River Group of the Pacific Reserve Fleet.  She remained in reserve until 1 March 1972, when her name was struck from the Navy list.  Her hulk was sold on 20 November 1972 to Zidell Explorations, Inc., of Portland, Oregon, for scrapping.

Awards
Spangler earned two battle stars during World War II.

References

External links 
 
 USS Spangler site 

Buckley-class destroyer escorts
Ships built in Bay City, Michigan
World War II frigates and destroyer escorts of the United States
1943 ships